Sormea orbignyi is a species of beetle in the family Cerambycidae, and the only species in the genus Sormea. It was described by Félix Édouard Guérin-Méneville in 1831.

References

Homonoeini
Beetles described in 1831